Galaxy Express could refer to
Galaxy Express 999, a comic
Samsung Galaxy Express, a smartphone
Galaxy Express Corporation, a rocket vendor
Galaxy Express (band), a South Korean garage rock band
GX (rocket) (Galaxy Express GX), a Nippo-American rocket